Laqueur is a surname, and the people with the surname include.

 Ludwig Laqueur (1839—1909), German ophthalmologist
 Marianne Laqueur (1918–2006), German Jewish refugee to Turkey, computer scientist and local politician
 Richard Laqueur (1881—1959), German historian and philologist
 Thomas W. Laqueur (born 1945), American historian, sexologist and writer
 Walter Laqueur (1921-2018), American historian and political commentator

Jewish surnames